Valentin Ilievski (born 16 October 1968) is a Macedonian-German mechanical engineer, businessman, Senior Vice President South Eastern Europe Messer Group and 38th and current president of the assembly of FK Sarajevo since December 2016, taking charge of the club from his predecessor Edis Kusturica.

References

1968 births
Living people
People from Kumanovo
People from Macedonia (region)
Macedonian businesspeople
German people of Macedonian descent
FK Sarajevo presidents of the assembly